Below are lists of Islamic scholars according to the field of expertise.

Lists
 List of contemporary Islamic scholars
 List of Islamic historians
 List of Islamic jurists
 List of Islamic philosophers
 List of Muslim astronomers
 List of Muslim comparative religionists
 List of Muslim mathematicians
 List of Muslim scientists
 List of Quran interpreters
 List of Shia Muslim Islamic scholars

Unorthodox scholars
 Allama Mashriqi
 Ghulam Ahmed Parwez

Converts to Islam who are Islamic scholars
 Joel Hayward
 Khalid Yasin
 Siraj Wahaj
 Roger Garaudy
 Hamza Yusuf
 Hussein Ye
 Ivan Aguéli  
 Sherman Jackson
 Marmaduke Pickthall
 Khalid Blankinship
 Joseph E. B. Lumbard
 Michael Wolfe
 Nuh Keller
 Frithjof Schuon
 Timothy Winter
 Bilal Philips
 Zaid Shakir
 Muhammad Asad 
 Martin Lings
 Ibn Yaḥyā al-Maghribī al-Samawʾal
 Abdalqadir as-Sufi
 Malcolm X
 Warith Deen Mohammed
 Suhaib Webb
 Umar Vadillo

See also 
 Ulama – Muslim legal scholars
 Allamah 
 Mullah
 List of Da'is
 List of Arab scientists
 List of Iranian scientists
 List of Turkish philosophers and scientists
 Islamic philosophy
 Early Islamic philosophy
 Islamic advice literature
 List of Marjas
 List of Ayatollahs

External links 
 Alfonso X el sabio, Escuela de Traductores in English
 List of Muslim scholars

 
Islam-related lists